Bhupendra Rajnikant Patel (born 15 July 1962) is an Indian politician and the current Chief Minister of Gujarat since September 2021. He is a member of the Bharatiya Janata Party (BJP). He started his political career in municipal bodies of Ahmedabad before being elected the member of Gujarat Legislative Assembly representing Ghatlodia constituency in 2017.

Early life and career 
Bhupendrabhai Patel was born on 15 July 1962 to a Gujarati in Ahmedabad, Gujarat, India. Bhupendrabhai Patel has received Diploma in Civil Engineering from the Government Polytechnic, Ahmedabad in April 1982. He has been associated with Rashtriya Swayamsevak Sangh.

He is a builder by profession. He is a trustee of Sardardham Vishwa Patidar Kendra and a chairman of the standing committee of Vishwa Umiya Foundation. He is a follower of Akram Vignan Movement founded by Dada Bhagwan. He is interested in cricket and badminton.

Political career

Municipal Councillor
Patel was the member of Memnagar Nagarpalika in 1995–1996, 1999-2000 and 2004–2006. He was the President of Memnagar Nagarpalika in 1999–2000. He was a Vice Chairman of school board of Amdavad Municipal Corporation (AMC) from 2008 to 2010. He was a councillor from Thaltej Ward from 2010 to 2015. He was a chairman of the Ahmedabad Urban Development Authority (AUDA) from 2015 to 2017. He also served as a chairman of the Standing Committee of AMC.

Member of Gujarat Legislative Assembly
Patel became a member of Gujarat Legislative Assembly for the Ghatlodia constituency after winning the 2017 Gujarat Legislative Assembly elections, running against Shashikant Patel of the Indian National Congress. He won by a record margin of 1,17,000 votes.

He was elected again from Ghotlodia constituency in 2022 Gujarat Legislative Assembly election as a BJP candidate defeating his nearest rival and Indian National Congress candidate Amiben Yagnik.

Chief Minister of Gujarat

First Term (2021 - 2022) 
On 11 September 2021, Vijay Rupani resigned from the post of Chief Minister of Gujarat. Patel was unanimously elected as the BJP legislative party leader and Chief Minister elect of Gujarat on 12 September 2021 in the party legislature meeting at Gandhinagar. He was sworn in as the Chief Minister of Gujarat on 13 September 2021. 

On 8 February 2022, he launched a new Gujarat IT/ITeS policy 2022-2027. His government also became the first state to set up a committee to study modalities and implementation of Uniform Civil Code in the state, applying the same to the citizens of the state.

Second Term (2022 - present) 
In the 2022 Gujarat Legislative Assembly Elections, the Bharatiya Janata Party won a record-breaking 156 of the total 182 seats, with the party forming the state government for the 7th consecutive time. On 12 December 2022, Patel took oath as the Chief Minister of Gujarat, for the second time with this massive win.

See also

 Bhupendrabhai Patel ministry

References

Gujarat MLAs 2017–2022
Gujarat MLAs 2022–2027
Bharatiya Janata Party politicians from Gujarat
Living people
Politicians from Ahmedabad
Chief Ministers of Gujarat
1962 births
State cabinet ministers of Gujarat
Chief ministers from Bharatiya Janata Party
Gujarati people
Ahmedabad municipal councillors
Rashtriya Swayamsevak Sangh members